Kinpurnie Hill is one of the most famous hills of the Sidlaw range in south-east Perthshire.

Kinpurnie Hill is located near Newtyle and is popular with hillwalkers.

Name and etymology 
The name Kinpurney was recorded in 1317 as Kylprony and has been described as "enigmatic". The initial element may be Gaelic coille meaning "wood", or ceann, "head". The -purney element appears to occur in several place-names in Aberdeenshire and may derive from Gaelic pronn meaning "crumbly soil". Or else, the element may be Pictish and derivation from a word related to Welsh bron, "breast, breast-shaped hill", has been suggested by linguist Guto Rhys.

Kinpurnie Tower 
Atop the hill is Kinpurnie Tower, designed by Rev Alexander Bryce (1713 - 1786), minister of Kirknewton and later East Calder and built by amateur astronomer James Stuart-Mackenzie in 1766 to be used as an observatory.

It stands next to the site of an unfinished iron-age fort; remains of the vitrified walls and the large ditch can be seen in the area of the viewfinder and trig point. The viewfinder is useful for picking out the distant hills on a clear day.

However, as it was such a well known landmark, plans were drawn up to restore the structure and the work, funded by the local authority and the Cayzer Estate, was completed in 1974.

References

https://www.walkhighlands.co.uk/angus/kinpurney-hill.shtml
http://www.walkscotland.com/route119.htm

Mountains and hills of Angus, Scotland
Geography of Angus, Scotland